Schifter is a surname. Notable people with the surname include:

Andreas Schifter (1779–1852), Danish naval officer, shipbuilder, naval administrator, and admiral
Günther Schifter (1923–2008), Austrian journalist, radio presenter, and record collector
Richard Schifter (1923–2020), Austrian-American attorney and diplomat